Truth: Live in St. Petersburg, or t.A.T.u. Truth is an official live DVD release by t.A.T.u. of their 2006 performance in St. Petersburg. The DVD was scheduled for release in early 2006. However, after the group split from Universal Music, they announced they only had plans to release the DVD in Japan. After further legal issues with Universal, the DVD was released on 12 September 2007. The songs "Cosmos (Outer Space)", "Novaya Model", "Chto Ne Hvataet", "Polchasa" and "Dangerous and Moving" that were a part of the set list were cut from the final release of the DVD. This was t.A.T.u.'s first release after leaving Universal Music.

On 28 January 2020, the live album of Truth: Live in St. Petersburg was released on major music streaming services. The songs that we cut from the DVD's final release were included in the live album. However, the album was dropped from streaming services and can't be currently streamed.

DVD Features 

 In between songs, clips are shown of interviews as well as the girls preparing for the gig. Some footage from "t.A.T.u. Expedition" is also shown, including unseen clips. Some more songs were played during the concert, but they only appeared on the TV broadcast and not the DVD release (Chto Ne Hvataet, Novaya Model, Polchasa, Cosmos and Dangerous and Moving).

Live Album Tracklist 

Tracklist adapted from Spotify & Apple Music

Cast

t.A.T.u. 
Lena Katina and Yulia Volkova - vocals

t.A.T.u. band  
Sven Martin - Keyboards, piano, backing vocals, Musical Director
Troy MacCubbin - Guitars, backing vocals
Steve Wilson - Drums
Domen Vajevec - Bass, keyboard

References

T.A.T.u. video albums